Eosentomon mixtum is a species of proturan in the family Eosentomidae. It is found in Africa, Europe, and Northern Asia (excluding China).

References

Eosentomon
Articles created by Qbugbot
Animals described in 1945